Alan J. Friedman (November 14, 1942 – May 4, 2014) was a physicist who was director of the New York Hall of Science (NYSCI) for 22 years. He died of pancreatic cancer at the age of 71.

He received the 1996 Award for the Public Understanding of Science and Technology from the American Association for the Advancement of Science.

References

External links
 http://www.lawrencehallofscience.org/about/newsroom/in_the_news/remembering_dr_alan_j_friedman
 Friedman Center - NYSCI
 NYSCI
 NY Times Obituary
 Scientific American

1942 births
2014 deaths
Deaths from pancreatic cancer
American physicists
Scientists from Brooklyn
People from Queens, New York
Florida State University alumni
Georgia Tech alumni
Deaths from cancer in New York (state)
New York Hall of Science